

Basketball (NBA)
  1972–1985, became Sacramento Kings:  Home court was the Kemper Arena.

Indoor Soccer
 Kansas City Kings PASL-Premier A soccer team who plays in suburban north Kansas City, MO